Elections to the Labour Party's Shadow Cabinet took place in October 1994, at the beginning of the 1994/5 session of parliament. Under the rules then in effect, the Commons members of the Parliamentary Labour Party elected 18 members of the Official Opposition Shadow Cabinet, who were then assigned portfolios by the leader. The Commons members of the PLP separately elected the Chief Whip, and the Labour peers elected the Leader of the Opposition in the House of Lords. In addition, the Leader of the Labour Party and Deputy Leader (Tony Blair and John Prescott, respectively) were members by virtue of those offices. The 18 elected members of the Shadow Cabinet were the ones with the largest number of votes. MPs were required to vote for at least four women, but women were not necessarily guaranteed places in the Shadow Cabinet.

† Multiple candidates tied for position.

References

1994
Labour Party Shadow Cabinet election
Labour Party Shadow Cabinet election